Kalevi Vähäkylä (born 25 June 1940) is a Finnish biathlete. He competed in the 20 km individual event at the 1968 Winter Olympics.

References

External links
 

1940 births
Living people
Finnish male biathletes
Olympic biathletes of Finland
Biathletes at the 1968 Winter Olympics
People from Salo, Finland
Sportspeople from Southwest Finland